Saint Alkelda ("healing spring"; died on 28 March c. 800), also spelt Alcelda or  Alchhild, was ostensibly an Anglo-Saxon princess of whom almost nothing is known and whose existence has been questioned.

Alternative origins
Legend has it that she was an Anglo-Saxon princess, and probably also a nun, who was strangled by pagan Viking women during Danish raids in about 800 at Middleham in Yorkshire. She is patron of the church at Giggleswick and also of that of Middleham, the church there having a holy well, but of no others. She may have been in addition abbess of a monastery at Middleham.

 
The area is known for its many springs, some very near the sites of these churches. With no documentary reference to this saint until the late Middle Ages, it has been surmised that the name Alkelda is a corruption of an Anglo-Saxon word, haligkelda, meaning holy spring. However, this has been contested, also with claims that she may actually have been Icelandic, from Ölkelda, and her reputation brought to Yorkshire in Northern England by Vikings, where she became associated with holy springs such as Giggleswick.

Her feast day is 28 March.

References

External links
Account of Saint Alkelda from Giggleswick church
Description of Saint Alkelda's Well at Middleham

800 deaths
Anglo-Saxon royalty
Northumbrian saints
Yorkshire saints
8th-century Christian saints
Year of birth unknown
Medieval English saints
Female saints of medieval England
8th-century English people
8th-century English women
Middleham